Cosmos is the ninth studio album by the Japanese rock band Buck-Tick. The album was released on June 21, 1996, through Victor Entertainment. It was the group's last album released through Victor and peaked at number six on the Oricon charts. Cosmos has sold 130,000 copies within two weeks. The album was digitally remastered and re-released on September 19, 2002, with two bonus tracks. It was remastered and re-released again on September 5, 2007. The song "Tight Rope" was later re-recorded as the b-side to the group's "Alice in Wonder Underground" single in 2007, and "Sane" was re-recorded in 2012 for their "Elise no Tame ni" single. The album was heavily influenced by electronic music, as the band started gravitating towards cyberpunk music.

Track listing

Personnel
 Atsushi Sakurai - lead vocals
 Hisashi Imai - lead guitar, backing vocals
 Hidehiko Hoshino - rhythm guitar, keyboards, backing vocals
 Yutaka Higuchi - bass
 Toll Yagami - drums

Additional performers
 Kazutoshi Yokoyama - keyboards, piano, backing vocals

Production
  Koniyang - producer, recording, mixing[A], mastering
 Buck-Tick - producers
 Takafumi Muraki; Naoki Toyoshima - executive producers
 Shinichi Ishizuka - mixing[A]
 Hitoshi Hiruma; Takahiro Uchida - engineers
 Kenichi Araki; Akinori Kaizaki; Hiroshi Tanigawa; Masanobu Murakami; Naoki Ibaraki; Mikiro Yamada - assistant engineers
 Ken Sakaguchi - cover art, graphic design
 Nicci Keller; Alan Solon - photography

Notes

<li id="notea">^ ^* The only song that Shinichi Ishizuka mixed and that Koniyang did not mix was "Chocolate".

References

External links
 

Buck-Tick albums
Victor Entertainment albums
1996 albums
Japanese-language albums